Here, Beneath the North Star is a 1968 Finnish drama film directed by Edvin Laine. It was entered into the 6th Moscow International Film Festival. The film is based on the first two volumes of Väinö Linna's novel trilogy Under the North Star. The third volume was adapted into a film two years later under the title Akseli and Elina.

Plot
Film begins the founding of the Koskela croft in the 1880s and tells the story of the life of the people of the imaginary Pentinkulma village until about 1920. The central theme is the unstable position of crofters and their goal to improve their living conditions. The rural upper class, such as the priestly family, and the poor people, whose socio-economic status is weaker than that of crofters, also play an important role. The story of the film goes all the way to the end of the Finnish Civil War between the Red Guards (Crofters) and the Whites (Government). The battle scene depicts the Battle of Syrjäntaka.

Cast
 Aarno Sulkanen as Akseli Koskela
 Titta Karakorpi as Elina Koskela
 Risto Taulo as Jussi Koskela
 Anja Pohjola as Alma Koskela
 Eero Keskitalo as Aleksi Koskela
 Paavo Pentikäinen as Aku Koskela
 Kauko Helovirta as Otto Kivivuori
 Mirjam Novero as Anna Kivivuori
 Esa Saario as Janne Kivivuori
 Pekka Autiovuori as Oskari Kivivuori
 Kalevi Kahra as Adolf Halme
 Asta Backman as Emma Halme
 Rose-Marie Precht as Ellen Salpakari
 Matti Ranin as Lauri Salpakari

References

External links
 

1968 films
1968 drama films
Finnish drama films
1960s Finnish-language films
Films directed by Edvin Laine
Films based on Finnish novels
Films based on works by Väinö Linna